In fortification, a lunette was originally an outwork of half-moon shape; later it became a redan with short flanks, in trace somewhat resembling a bastion standing by itself without curtains on either side. The gorge was generally open.

One noted historical example of a lunette was the one used at the Battle of the Alamo in San Antonio, Texas, in March 1836. Another were the Bagration flèches, at the Battle of Borodino, in 1812.

See also
 List of established military terms

References

Fortification (architectural elements)